Choi Tak, previously Sheung Choi, is one of the 37 constituencies in the Kwun Tong District of Hong Kong which was created in 2011.

The constituency loosely covers part of Choi Tak Estate with the estimated population of 17,540.

Councillors represented

Election results

2010s

References

Constituencies of Hong Kong
2011 in Hong Kong
Constituencies of Kwun Tong District Council
2011 establishments in Hong Kong
Constituencies established in 2011